Dave Hull (born 3 November 1985) is an English former professional rugby league footballer who has played in the 2000s and 2010s.

Dave Hull played his junior career alongside James Graham at the Thatto Heath club.

In 2007, Hull was promoted to train with the St. Helens first team squad.

References

External links
St Helens profile
Saints Heritage Society profile
Hull in squad to face Salford

1985 births
Living people
English rugby league players
Rochdale Hornets players
Rugby league fullbacks
Rugby league players from St Helens, Merseyside
St Helens R.F.C. players
Swinton Lions players